"The Song We Made Love To" is a song written by Kenneth Wahle, and recorded by American country music artist Mickey Gilley. It was released in November 1978 as the lead single and title track from his album The Songs We Made Love To. The song reached number 13 on the U.S. Billboard Hot Country Singles chart and number 26 on the Canadian RPM Country Tracks chart in Canada.

Chart performance

References

1978 singles
1978 songs
Mickey Gilley songs
Song recordings produced by Eddie Kilroy
Playboy Records singles